Sang Chen (born 3 July 1973) is a Chinese television host.

Biography
Sang was born in Beijing on July 3, 1973. After graduating from the Communication University of China in 1996, she joined the China Central Television, working as a host of Together Across the Strait. She is the host of Memoirs of the Nation and Across the Strait.

Personal life
Sang Chen is married and has a daughter.

References

External links
 

1973 births
People from Beijing
Living people
Communication University of China alumni
CCTV television presenters